"Don't Take It Away" is a song written by Troy Seals and Max D. Barnes, and recorded by American country music artist Jody Miller on her 1975 album, Will You Love Me Tomorrow.  Her song peaked at number 67 on the U.S. Country charts in 1975.  It was covered by American country music artist Conway Twitty in March 1979 as the first single from his album Cross Winds.  Twitty's version was his 21st number one country hit.  The single stayed at number one for a single week and spent a total of nine weeks on the country chart.

Charts

Weekly charts

Year-end charts

References

1979 singles
1975 songs
Jody Miller songs
Conway Twitty songs
Songs written by Troy Seals
Songs written by Max D. Barnes
MCA Records singles